Beaver Township is a township in Republic County, Kansas, United States.

History
Beaver Township was organized in 1873. It was named from the Beaver Creek.

References

Townships in Republic County, Kansas
Townships in Kansas